Finland was represented by Kristina Hautala, with the song "Kun kello käy", at the 1968 Eurovision Song Contest, which took place on 6 April in London.

Before Eurovision

National final
The Finnish Final was held on February 10 at the YLE TV Studios in Helsinki. It was hosted by Liisa Horelli. The winner was chosen by postcard voting where each voter awarded 5, 3 and 1 points to his three favorite songs. The results were announced on 2nd March.

At Eurovision
On the night of the final Kristina Hautala performed ninth in the running order, following Sweden and preceding France. The entry was conducted by Ossi Runne. At the close of voting, Finland picked up one point from Norway and placed joint last with the Netherlands of the 17 entries.

Sources
Viisukuppila, Muistathan: Suomen karsinnat 1968 
Finnish national final 1968 on natfinals

1968
Countries in the Eurovision Song Contest 1968
Eurovision